Richard Keys (born 23 April 1957) is an English sports presenter who has worked for BBC, ITV, Channel 4, Sky, Talksport, Al Jazeera, Fox Sports, ESPN Star Sports , BeIN Sports; and has presented many top-level football matches.

Career
His career started in London in 1976 when he began working for the Fleet Street Sports Agency Hayter's until 1978, when he moved to Liverpool and worked at Radio City as a football commentator.

In 1982, he moved to Manchester to work at Piccadilly Radio as sports editor and football commentator. In 1984 Keys moved back to London, where he joined the ITV network as one of the main anchors of breakfast show TV-am. While working at TV-am he also commentated on football matches for ITV and cycling for Channel 4, including two Tours de France.

Keys was one of the presenters for the Sports Channel on British Satellite Broadcasting (BSB) in spring 1990. When BSB merged with Sky in 1991, the channel was renamed Sky Sports. He presented TV-am for the last time on 28 December 1990 before leaving for Sky Sports. 

He presented Sky Sports coverage of Premier League football since the league's inception in 1992. He was the presenter of the flagship Super Sunday and also presented Sky's Monday Night Football, which coincided with Sky gaining rights for the UEFA Champions League. Later he fronted all of Sky Sports' Champions League coverage.

In 2008, Keys also presented the UEFA Euro 2008 for Al Jazeera Sports.

Departure from Sky Sports
In January 2011, Keys left Sky Sports after making derogatory comments about female assistant referee Sian Massey. His off-air comments about Massey and the fitness of women to officiate at football matches were recorded and leaked. Further clips were leaked showing co-presenter Andy Gray and Keys behaving in a sexist manner.

Keys apologised for the "prehistoric banter" and said: "Such comments were made off-air to work colleagues, and were, of course, never intended to be broadcast." He added that "If off-air conversations of television and radio presenters were recorded, there would be no one left working. That is not to defend what happened."

Keys later joined talkSPORT radio, where he presented on Saturday evenings.  Later in 2011, Keys returned to television broadcasting launching the boxing channel Boxnation with boxing promoter Frank Warren.

Al Jazeera, beIN Sports and Talksport
In June 2013, Al Jazeera agreed a contract with Keys and Andy Gray. They present English and European football coverage from Doha, Qatar, including the Premier League, UEFA Champions League, and FA Cup.

Coverage started for the 2013–14 season while they continued to present their TalkSport show from Qatar.

Keys and Gray are the mainstays of the football coverage on BeIN Sports channels, which broadcasts all 380 Premier League games per season.

Personal life
From the age of four, Richard Keys had a passion for football, ever since his father took him to watch Coventry City play Swansea Town in the old Third Division. He was educated at the now-defunct Whitley Abbey Comprehensive School, where he was head boy.

Awards
In 2003, Keys has received an Honorary title from Coventry University (Honorary Doctor of Letters) for outstanding services to sports broadcasting.

In 2012, Keys and Andy Gray received the best sports programme prize for their talkSPORT show at the Sony Radio Academy Awards.

He has also received a variety of best sports presenter awards from different publications.

Charity work
Keys and Geoff Shreeves have helped to raise money for Nordoff-Robbins (A musical charity for Children with Autism).

Keys is a patron of the Willow Foundation, a charity for people with special needs, founded by the former Arsenal goalkeeper Bob Wilson in memory of his late daughter.

References

External links
 

1957 births
Association football commentators
Boxing commentators
Cycling announcers
English association football commentators
Living people
People from Coventry
Sky Sports presenters and reporters